Bayan Tal (born 1 August 1962) is a Jordanian media development, media literacy, and communication specialist . She was the first female director general for JRTVC.

Early life 

Bayan Tal was born in Tafilah. Her father is the academic, educator and Cultural Attaché Ahmad Youssef Al Tal. Her sister is Lina Attel and her brothers are Hazem, Maher and Muhannad. She enrolled in Jordan schools until her father became Cultural Attaché at Embassy in Pakistan where she enrolled in Pakistani schools. She earned a Bachelor of Arts in English Language and a Literature minor in French from University of Jordan.

Career
Tal began her career at age 17 at JRTVC as a broadcast journalist and news anchor, staying from 1979 until 1999. She later became a director and Chief Anchor of the news in the English department. Then she was assigned to be director of training and development. Tal joined the Prime Ministry of Jordan and was director of Government Communication for one year. 

She served as international press secretary to His Majesty King Abdullah II at The Royal Hashemite Court for five years. Then Tal returned to JRTVC as its first female director general. After that she was a senior adviser at Jordan Media Institute, where she designed and led the first Media and Information Literacy (MIL) project in 2016 to integrate MIL into schools and universities and youth centers. She wrote several articles on MIL  and participated in TV interviews. 

She was part of a team of experts who finalized a project with the National Center for Curriculum Development to integrate MIL into curricula of grades KG2-12, and assisted in drafting the national strategy for MIL in Jordan. 

She is a member of the Boards of Trustees of the Crown Prince Foundation, a member of the Board of JRTVC and the Baptism Development Zone Foundation. She mentored the Ethical Journalism Network (EJN) Fellowship for Arab journalists and media practitioners, and judged media competitions including: Journalists for Human Rights (JHR) Human Rights Reporting Award, King Hussein Cancer Foundation Media Awards, and The Inquirer Award for Investigative Reporter of the Year.

Personal life
Bayan Tal is married to Mohammed Bataineh, their children are Bushra, Nayef and Amin.

Relevant articles and contributions

References

External links
 

1962 births
Jordanian women journalists
People from Amman
Jordanian journalists
Living people
University of Jordan alumni
Arab journalists
Jordanian television presenters
Jordanian women television presenters
Jordanian television people
20th-century journalists
Women television journalists